The 2018 Mid-Eastern Athletic Conference women's basketball tournament took place March 5–10, 2018, at the Norfolk Scope in Norfolk, Virginia. First round games were played March 5 and March 6, with the quarterfinal games played on March 7 and 8. The semifinals were held March 9, with the championship game on March 10.

Seeds 
All 13 teams were eligible for the tournament.

Teams were seeded by record within the conference, with a tiebreaker system to seed teams with identical conference records.

Schedule

Bracket

References

External links
 Official site

2017–18 Mid-Eastern Athletic Conference women's basketball season
MEAC women's basketball tournament
Basketball competitions in Norfolk, Virginia
College basketball tournaments in Virginia
Women's sports in Virginia